Funny Money may refer to:

Funny Money, a farce written by Ray Cooney
 Funny Money (1983 film), a British crime film
 Funny Money (2006 film), a comedy film
 Funny Money (band), an American rock band

 See also
For the meaning of false currency, see counterfeit money or Test money